Gilawat Aminabad is a village and Gram panchayat in Bilhaur Tehsil, Kanpur Nagar district, Uttar Pradesh, India. Its village code is 149905. As per 2011 Census of India report the population of the village is 987 where 540 are men and 447 are women. It is located 65 KM towards North from Kanpur.

References

Villages in Kanpur Nagar district